José Antonio 'Toni' García Aparicio (born 24 January 1976) is a Spanish former footballer who played as a goalkeeper, and is a current manager.

Club career
Born in Córdoba, Andalusia, García was a youth graduate at Real Madrid, making his senior debuts with the C-team in the 1996–97 season. He played mostly in Segunda División B but also in Tercera División in his early years as a senior, representing Torredonjimeno CF, Moralo CP, CF Extremadura, Talavera CF and Lucena CF.

In July 2011, García signed with Real Jaén also in the third level. He was an undisputed starter during his spell, notably playing 37 games in his second season – plus six in the playoffs – as the club returned to Segunda División after an 11-year absence.

On 18 August 2013, aged already 37, García appeared in his first professional match, a 1–2 home defeat against SD Eibar.

References

External links

1976 births
Living people
Footballers from Córdoba, Spain
Spanish footballers
Association football goalkeepers
Segunda División players
Segunda División B players
Tercera División players
Real Madrid C footballers
Sevilla Atlético players
CF Extremadura footballers
Talavera CF players
Lucena CF players
Real Jaén footballers
Spanish football managers